Allen Grove is a plantation house  and historic district located in Old Spring Hill, Alabama.  The Greek Revival house was built for John Gray Allen in 1857 by David Rudisill.  It is a two-story frame structure with a two-story front portico featuring square paneled columns. The roof is hipped with side dormers. In 1890 the rear facade was altered when a kitchen and pantry wing and a two-story back porch was added.  The house and two other plantation buildings were added to the National Register of Historic Places on July 7, 1994, as a part of the Plantation Houses of the Alabama Canebrake and Their Associated Outbuildings Multiple Property Submission.

References

National Register of Historic Places in Marengo County, Alabama
Historic districts in Marengo County, Alabama
Houses on the National Register of Historic Places in Alabama
Greek Revival houses in Alabama
Houses completed in 1857
Plantation houses in Alabama
Houses in Marengo County, Alabama
Historic districts on the National Register of Historic Places in Alabama
1857 establishments in Alabama